"The Closest Thing to Crazy" is the debut single of Georgia-born singer Katie Melua. The song is featured on her first studio album, Call Off the Search (2003). The song was written as part of the musical Men Who March Away', and appeared first in 1995 on Mike Batt's album Arabesque''.

The single was originally due out in January 2004 but was released a month early in an attempt by Terry Wogan to make it that year's Christmas number one in the United Kingdom; it stalled at number 10 on the UK Singles Chart. However, owing to the success of the album reaching number one, the song climbed back into the top 20 during January and February and resulted in Melua's first nomination for the annual Record of the Year prize on ITV1. At the end of 2004, due to its longevity on the UK chart, the song came in at number 77 on the year-end chart, making it the lowest-charting song to finish within the top 100 for that year.

Composition and lyrics
The song is played in the key of E major at a tempo of 64 beats per minute. The vocal range is G3-C5.

The lyrics of the song take the form of a series of rhetorical questions, describing the contradictory emotions of being in love. It appears that the object of the singer's love treats the singer unkindly, and may not return the emotion.

Track listings

UK CD single
 "The Closest Thing to Crazy" (Mike Batt)
 "Faraway Voice" (Katie Melua)
 "I Think It's Going to Rain" (Randy Newman)

UK enhanced CD single
 "The Closest Thing to Crazy" (Batt)
 "Downstairs to the Sun" (Melua)
 "Thank You, Stars" (Batt)
 "The Closest Thing to Crazy" (video)

European enhanced CD single
 "The Closest Thing to Crazy" (Batt)
 "Downstairs to the Sun" (Melua)
 "The Closest Thing to Crazy" (video)

Australian CD single
 "The Closest Thing to Crazy" (Batt)
 "Downstairs to the Sun" (Melua)
 "Thank You, Stars" (Batt)

Personnel
 Katie Melua – guitar, vocals
 Mike Batt – organ, piano, conductor
 Jim Cregan – guitar
 Tim Harries – bass
 Irish Film Orchestra – orchestra
 Michael Kruk – drums
 Alan Smale – leader
 Chris Spedding – guitar
 Henry Spinetti – drums
 Mike Batt – producer
 Steve Sale – engineer
 Mike Batt – arranger

Charts

Weekly charts

Year-end charts

Certifications

Release history

References

External links
 Katie Melua website
 New Music: Katie Melua (BBC News)

2003 songs
2003 debut singles
Katie Melua songs
Song recordings produced by Mike Batt
Songs written by Mike Batt
Dramatico singles
UK Independent Singles Chart number-one singles
2000s ballads